Problepsis subreferta is a moth of the  family Geometridae. It is found in China.

References

Moths described in 1935
Scopulini
Moths of Asia